Commonplace is the sixth album of the Japanese band Every Little Thing, released on March 10, 2004 by Avex Trax.

Background 
The album contains mainly soft rock and acoustic-like tunes, and a few rockish tunes as well. Ichirō Itō played guitar in all the songs, and also participated in the arrangements and compositions of some of them. All the lyrics were written by Kaori Mochida, but received help on track 5 "Country Road", which is the duo's first song that sang completely in English.

The album was released in a regular CD only version and a limited edition with a bonus DVD. The multimedia material includes behind the scenes shots at the album photoshoot, and also a special performance of 1998 single "Time Goes By".

Track listing

Notes
 co-arranged by Every Little Thing
 co-arranged by Ichiro Ito

Charts

External links
 Commonplace information at Avex Network.
 Commonplace information at Oricon.

2004 albums
Every Little Thing (band) albums